João Manuel Raposo Botelho (born 22 September 1985) is a Portuguese footballer who plays as a goalkeeper.

Club career
Born in Ponta Delgada, Azores, Botelho was a product of local C.D. Santa Clara's youth system, making his first-team debut in 2003–04 (one match in the Segunda Liga). In the following seasons, with the side also in that level, he backed up Nuno Santos for two years before being first choice the same amount of time.

In 2008–09, with Santa Clara in the same tier, Botelho again appeared as understudy, now to Alemão. In the following campaign more of the same befell, after the signing of English Matt Jones (no league matches).

Botelho resumed his career in division three, with A.D. Camacha and CD Operário. In the summer of 2013 he returned to Santa Clara but, in December of the same year, re-joined his previous club.

International career
Botelho appeared for the Portuguese under-21 team at the 2007 UEFA European Championship in the Netherlands, as backup to Paulo Ribeiro. He did not leave the bench during the competition, and never won caps for that or any category.

References

External links

1985 births
Living people
People from Ponta Delgada
Portuguese footballers
Association football goalkeepers
Liga Portugal 2 players
Segunda Divisão players
C.D. Santa Clara players
CD Operário players
CU Micaelense players